CrazyNDaLazDayz is the only studio album by American hip hop trio Tear Da Club Up Thugs, consisting of DJ Paul, Lord Infamous and Juicy J. It was released on February 2, 1999 via Hypnotize Minds/Relativity. Recording sessions took place at Cotton Row Recording Studio and Hypnotize Minds Studio in Memphis, Tennessee. It features guest appearances from the Hot Boys, the Big Tymers, Crucial Conflict, Hussein Fatal, Spice 1, The Kaze, Too $hort and Twista. The album spawned two singles: "Push 'Em Off" and "Hypnotize Cash Money". The latter peaked at #74 on the Hot R&B/Hip-Hop Songs chart and at #64 on the R&B/Hip-Hop Airplay chart in the United States.

The album reached number 18 on the Billboard 200 albums chart and number 4 on the Top R&B/Hip-Hop Albums chart in the United States. It was certified gold by the Recording Industry Association of America on January 13, 2004.

Track listing

Personnel
Paul Duane Beauregard – main artist, producer, executive producer
Jordan Michael Houston – main artist, producer, executive producer
Ricky Dunigan – main artist
Niko Lyras – mixing & recording
Steve Moller – mixing & recording
Lil' Pat – mixing & recording (track 2)
Chris Gehringer – mastering
Pen & Pixel – artwork & design

Charts

Weekly charts

Year-end charts

Certifications

References

External links 

1999 albums
Three 6 Mafia albums
Albums produced by DJ Paul
Albums produced by Juicy J